Stanislaus County is a county located in the San Joaquin Valley of the U.S. state of California. As of the 2020 census, the population was 552,878. The county seat is Modesto.

Stanislaus County makes up the Modesto Metropolitan Statistical Area. The county is located just east of the San Francisco Bay Area and serves as a bedroom community for those who work in the eastern part of the Bay Area.

History
The first European to see the area was Gabriel Moraga in 1806.

The county was named after the Estanislao river, which in turn was named in honor of Estanislao, a mission-educated renegade Native American chief who led a band of Native Americans in a series of battles against Mexican troops until finally being defeated by General Mariano Vallejo in 1826. Estanislao was his baptismal name, the Spanish name version after Saint Stanislaus the Martyr.

Between 1843 and 1846, when California was a province of independent Mexico, five Mexican land grants totaling  were granted in Stanislaus County. Rancho Orestimba y Las Garzas, Rancho Pescadero and Rancho Del Puerto were located on the west side of the San Joaquin River, and Rancho Del Rio Estanislao and Rancho Thompson on the north side of the Stanislaus River. However, the grant was never confirmed by the Land Commission.

Stanislaus County was formed from part of Tuolumne County in 1854. The county seat was first situated at Adamsville, then moved to Empire in November, La Grange in December, and Knights Ferry in 1862, and was ultimately fixed at the present location in Modesto in 1871.

As the price of housing has increased in the San Francisco Bay Area, many people who work in the southern reaches of the Bay Area have opted for the longer commute and moved to Stanislaus County for the relatively affordable housing.

Geography

Stanislaus County has historically been divided socially and economically by the north-flowing San Joaquin River, which provided a natural barrier to trade and travel for much of the county's history. Isolated from the main rail corridors through the county and the irrigation projects that generated much of the region's economic prosperity, the part of Stanislaus County west of the river (known to locals as the "West Side" of the county) has largely remained rural and economically dependent on agricultural activities. Because of its proximity to Interstate 5 and the California Aqueduct some towns within this area, including Patterson and Newman, have experienced tremendous growth and are being transformed into bedroom communities for commuters from the nearby San Francisco Bay Area, while others (including Westley and Crows Landing) have been almost entirely overlooked by development and remain tiny farming communities.

Flora and fauna
There are a number or rare and endangered species found in Stanislaus County. The Beaked Clarkia, (Clarkia rostrata), is listed as a candidate for the Federal Endangered Species List. It has only been found in blue oak-gray pine associations in the foothills of the Sierra Nevada, a habitat which occurs at moderately high elevations. Colusa Grass, (Neostapfsia colusana) is listed as endangered by the State. It is restricted to vernal pools. (Torrey, 1989)

National protected area
 San Joaquin River National Wildlife Refuge (part)

Transportation

Major highways
 Interstate 5
 State Route 4
 State Route 33
 State Route 99
 State Route 108
 State Route 120
 State Route 132
 State Route 165
 State Route 219

Public transportation
Stanislaus Regional Transit Authority (StanRTA) operates local bus service and paratransit in Modesto, regional service in Stanislaus County, and commuter service connecting to Bay Area Rapid Transit and Altamont Corridor Express.
The cities of Ceres, Oakdale, Riverbank, and Turlock run small local bus systems.
Both Greyhound and Amtrak have stops in Modesto and Turlock. Amtrak for Turlock actually stops in Denair.

Airports
Modesto City-County Airport has previously had a number of scheduled passenger flights. Currently, its main air traffic is general aviation. Other (general aviation) airports around the county include Oakdale Airport, Patterson Airport, and Turlock Airpark.

Demographics

2020 census

Note: the US Census treats Hispanic/Latino as an ethnic category. This table excludes Latinos from the racial categories and assigns them to a separate category. Hispanics/Latinos can be of any race.

2011

Places by population, race, and income

2010 Census
The 2010 United States Census reported that Stanislaus County had a population of 514,453. The racial makeup of Stanislaus County was 337,342 (65.6%) White, 14,721 (2.9%) African American, 5,902 (1.1%) Native American, 26,090 (5.1%) Asian (1.5% Indian, 1.1% Filipino, 0.7% Cambodian, 0.5% Chinese, 0.3% Vietnamese, 0.3% Laotian, 0.1% Japanese, 0.1% Korean, 0.1% Cambodian), 3,401 (0.7%) Pacific Islander, 99,210 (19.3%) from other races, and 27,787 (5.4%) from two or more races. Hispanic or Latino of any race were 215,658 persons (41.9%); 37.6% of Stanislaus County is Mexican, 0.6% Puerto Rican, 0.5% Salvadoran, 0.2% Nicaraguan, and 0.2% Guatemalan.

(Note - the US Census Bureau says "this system treats race and ethnicity as separate and independent categories.  This means that within the federal system everyone is classified as both a member of one of the four race groups and also as either Hispanic or non-Hispanic."  Consequently, there are a total of 8 race-ethnicity categories (e.g., White-Hispanic, White-non-Hispanic, Black-Hispanic, Black-non-Hispanic, etc.). That in turn means that the total Hispanic population is made up of each of the four groups, thus the separate distinction for Hispanic and non-Hispanic.)

2000
As of the census of 2000, there were 446,997 people, 145,146 households, and 109,585 families residing in the county. The population density was 299 people per square mile (116/km2). There were 150,807 housing units at an average density of 101 per square mile (39/km2). The racial/ethnic makeup of the county was 69.3% White, 2.6% Black, 4.2% Asian, 1.3% Native American, 0.3% Pacific Islander, 16.8% from other races, and 5.4% from two or more races. 31.7% of the population were Hispanic or Latino of any race. 8.4% were of German, 6.3% English, 6.0% American, 5.5% Irish, and 5.1% Portuguese ancestry according to Census 2000. 67.8% spoke English, 23.7% Spanish, 1.5% Syriac, and 1.3% Portuguese as their first language.

There were 145,146 households, out of which 41.20% had children under the age of 18 living with them, 56.0% were married couples living together, 13.7% had a female householder with no husband present, and 24.5% were non-families. 19.4% of all households were made up of individuals, and 7.9% had someone living alone who was 65 years of age or older.  The average household size was 3.03 and the average family size was 3.47.

In the county, the population was spread out, with 31.1% under the age of 18, 9.8% from 18 to 24, 29.0% from 25 to 44, 19.5% from 45 to 64, and 10.4% who were 65 years of age or older.  The median age was 32 years. For every 100 females there were 96.8 males.  For every 100 females age 18 and over, there were 93.4 males.

The median income for a household in the county was $40,101, and the median income for a family was $44,703. Males had a median income of $36,969 versus $26,595 for females. The per capita income for the county was $16,913.  About 12.3% of families and 16.0% of the population were below the poverty line, including 20.5% of those under age 18 and 8.8% of those age 65 or over.

Metropolitan Statistical Area
The United States Office of Management and Budget has designated Stanislaus County as the Modesto, CA Metropolitan Statistical Area.  The United States Census Bureau ranked the Modesto, CA Metropolitan Statistical Area as the 103rd most populous metropolitan statistical area of the United States as of July 1, 2012.

The Office of Management and Budget has further designated the Modesto, CA Metropolitan Statistical Area as a component of the more extensive San Francisco-Oakland-San Jose, CA Combined Statistical Area, the 5th most populous combined statistical area in the United States.

Crime 

The following table includes the number of incidents reported and the rate per 1,000 persons for each type of offense.

Cities by population and crime rates

Government, politics, and policing

Government

The Government of Stanislaus County is defined and authorized under the California Constitution and law as a general law county. The County government provides countywide services such as elections and voter registration, law enforcement, jails, vital records, property records, tax collection, public health, and social services. In addition the County serves as the local government for all unincorporated areas.

The County government is composed of the elected five-member Board of Supervisors, several other elected offices including the Sheriff-Coroner, District Attorney, Assessor, Auditor-Controller, Treasurer-Tax Collector, and Clerk-Recorder, and numerous county departments and entities under the supervision of the Chief Executive Officer. As of January 2021 the members of the Stanislaus County Board of Supervisors were:

 Buck Condit, District 1
 Vito Chiesa, District 2, Chairman
 Terry Withrow, District 3 Vice Chairman
 Mani Grewal, District 4
 Channce Condit, District 5,

Policing

Sheriff

The Stanislaus County Sheriff provides court protection, jail administration, and coroner services for the entire county of 540,000 in population. It provides patrol and detective services for the unincorporated areas of the county. The Sheriff also provides law enforcement services by contract to the municipalities of Riverbank, Patterson, Waterford, Salida, and Hughson. These municipalities fund police coverage as specified in the respective sheriff's contract with each city.

Municipal police
Municipal police departments in the county are: Modesto, population 213,000; Turlock, 73,000; Ceres, 46,000; Oakdale, 23,000;  Newman 11,000.

Politics

Voter registration statistics

Cities by population and voter registration

Overview 
Just like neighboring Merced County, Stanislaus is considered a bellwether county in presidential elections. The last major-party nominee to gain over 60% of the vote was Lyndon Johnson in 1964. Furthermore, in 1960, Stanislaus County was one of the most bellwether counties in terms of the popular vote, voting 0.02% more Democratic than the national average. It has voted for the winning candidate for president in every election since 1972 except in 2016 when it voted for Hillary Clinton instead of Donald Trump. In 2020, Joe Biden won the county in a slim victory returning the county to its status as bellwether county. The last Democrat to win a majority in the county was Jimmy Carter in 1976, although Barack Obama won a plurality in 2008 and 2012, as did Bill Clinton in both 1992 and 1996, and as Joe Biden did in 2020. 

  
  
  
  
  
  
  
  
  
  
  
  
  
  
  
  
  
  
  
  
  
  
  
  
  
  
  
  
  
  
  

In the California State Senate, Stanislaus is split between 3 legislative districts:
 ,
 , and
 .

Economy
Agriculture is Stanislaus County's number one industry, with almonds being the primary agricultural product.

Education

Tertiary
The California State University, Stanislaus is a campus of the California State University located in Turlock.

The Yosemite Community College District covers a 4,500 square mile area and serves a population over 550,000 encompassing all of two counties (Stanislaus and Tuolumne) and parts of 4 others (Calaveras, Merced, San Joaquin and Santa Clara). It is composed of 2 colleges: Modesto Junior College in Modesto and Columbia College in Sonora in Tuolumne County to the northeast.

There is also a Kaplan College campus in Modesto, an ITT Technical Institute campus in Lathrop in San Joaquin County to the northeast, and a San Joaquin Valley College campus in Modesto.

K-12 education
School districts include:

Unified:

 Ceres Unified School District
 Denair Unified School District
 Hughson Unified School District - Serves some areas for PK-12 and some only for 9-12
 Newman-Crows Landing Unified School District
 Oakdale Joint Unified School District - Serves some areas for PK-12 and some only for 9-12
 Patterson Joint Unified School District
 Riverbank Unified School District
 Turlock Unified School District - Serves some areas for PK-12 and some only for 9-12
 Waterford Unified School District

Secondary:
 Modesto City High School District

Elementary:

 Chatom Union Elementary School District
 Empire Union Elementary School District
 Gratton Elementary School District
 Hart-Ransom Union Elementary School District
 Hickman Community Charter School District
 Keyes Union Elementary School District
 Knights Ferry Elementary School District
 Modesto City Elementary School District
 Paradise Elementary School District
 Roberts Ferry Union Elementary School District
 Salida Union Elementary School District
 Shiloh Elementary School District
 Stanislaus Union Elementary School District
 Sylvan Union Elementary School District
 Valley Home Joint Elementary School District

Media
Stanislaus County is in the Sacramento television market, and thus receives Sacramento media.

The county also has media outlets that serve the local community:
The Modesto Press is the local online news site for Modesto and the surrounding areas of the Central Valley.
The Modesto Bee is a Modesto-based daily newspaper.

Communities

Incorporated cities

Ceres
Hughson
Modesto
Newman
Oakdale
Patterson
Riverbank
Turlock
Waterford

Census-designated places

Airport
Bret Harte
Bystrom
Cowan
Crows Landing
Del Rio
Denair
Diablo Grande
East Oakdale
Empire
Grayson
Hickman
Keyes
Knights Ferry
La Grange
Monterey Park Tract
Orange Blossom
Parklawn
Riverdale Park
Rouse
Salida
Shackelford (former)
Tuolumne
Valley Home
West Modesto
Westley

Other unincorporated communities

Hills Ferry
Langworth
McHenry
Montpelier
Mountain View
Oso
Roberts Ferry
Timba (or Orestimba)
Wood Colony

Eugene

Population ranking

The population ranking of the following table is based on the 2010 census of Stanislaus County.

† county seat

See also 
List of museums in the San Joaquin Valley
List of school districts in Stanislaus County, California
National Register of Historic Places listings in Stanislaus County, California

Notes

References

Further reading

 John T. Bramhall, The Story of Stanislaus. Modesto, CA: Modesto Herald, 1914.
 Sol P. Elias, Stories of Stanislaus: A Collection of Stories on the History and Achievement of Stanislaus County. Modesto, CA: Sol P. Elias, 1924.
John Torrey, Paul Awosika et al., Expanded initial study, Boulder Creek subdivision, Stanislaus County, Earth Metrics, Report 7999: California State Clearinghouse, Sacramento, November, 1989.
 A Memorial and Biographical History of the Counties of Merced, Stanislaus, Calaveras, Tuolumne and Mariposa, California. Chicago: Lewis Publishing Co., 1892.

External links

Connecting Stanislaus
Visit Stanislaus
Stanislaus County Fair
California State University Stanislaus
Modesto Junior College
Stanislaus PRIDE Center
Stanislaus County Farm Bureau
Stanislaus County Free Library
Stanislaus County Law Library

 
California counties
San Joaquin Valley
1854 establishments in California
Populated places established in 1854
Majority-minority counties in California